Luaib is a district in Qatar, located in the municipality of Al Rayyan.

In the 2015 census, it was listed as a district of zone no. 54 which has a population of 24,593 and also includes Baaya, Muraikh, Mehairja, Fereej Al Soudan, and Fereej Al Amir.

It borders Muraikh to the west, Mehairja to the south, Fereej Al Amir to the east and Old Al Rayyan to the north.

Etymology
Luaib's name originates from the Arabic term "waab", referring to "a vast, open plain that accommodates many things". The plain, which is the defining feature of the area, is rich in plant life.

Education
The following schools are located in Luaib:

References

Populated places in Al Rayyan